Asota spadix is a moth of the family Erebidae first described by Charles Swinhoe in 1901. It is found in Micronesia and the Solomon Islands.

References

Asota (moth)
Moths of Oceania
Moths described in 1901